Mellivora is a genus of mustelids that contains the honey badger or ratel (Mellivora capensis). It is also the sole living representative of the subfamily Mellivorinae. Additionally, two extinct species are known. The honey badger is native to much of Africa and South Asia, while fossil relatives occurred in those areas and Southern Europe.

Taxonomy
The genus Mellivora probably evolved from the more primitive Promellivora punjabiensis of India (which itself was formerly classified as M. punjabiensis). The two genera are grouped together in the tribe Eomellivorini together with the extinct giant mustelids Eomellivora and Ekorus.

Mellivora benfieldi is considered a likely ancestor of the living honey badger.

References

Mammal genera
Mammal genera with one living species
Badgers
Taxa named by Gottlieb Conrad Christian Storr